Herbert James Noel (May 15, 1903 – January 31, 1985) was an American actor, musician and stuntman.

Life and career 
Noel was born in Haverhill, Massachusetts. He was guitarist and singer with the trio The Rhythm Boys. Noel decided to leave the trio in 1935. After leaving, he worked as a police officer in Chicago, Illinois. He later moved to California, where he began his film and television career.

In 1938, Noel had his own band and appeared 12 times a week on radio. He played banjo, drums, guitar, and piano.

Noel's film career began with the 1944 film The Big Bonanza. He then appeared in the 1945 film Colorado Pioneers. Noel made numerous appearances in films such as Border Saddlemates, Ride the Man Down, The Oklahoman, Man from Del Rio, The Rawhide Years, The Fighting Chance, North to Alaska (with John Wayne), The Brass Legend and Masterson of Kansas.

Noel began appearing on television in 1953, initially in the television series The Gene Autry Show, where he made at least eleven appearances. He then appeared in the action and adventure television series Sergeant Preston of the Yukon. Noel made over 200 appearances in the American western television series Gunsmoke, in which he also served as the double for Milburn Stone as "Doc". He made numerous appearances in the television programs Bonanza, Tales of Wells Fargo, Wagon Train, Death Valley Days, The Rifleman, Bat Masterson, The Deputy, Tombstone Territory and Johnny Ringo. He also made at least 140 appearances in The Life and Legend of Wyatt Earp.

Personal life and death 
Noel married DeLories Ziegfeld on November 7, 1933, in Cambridge, Massachusetts. He was also married to Dawn Hope. That marriage ended with her death in 1939. He died in January 1985 in Los Angeles, California, at the age of 81.

References

External links 

Rotten Tomatoes profile

1903 births
1985 deaths
People from Haverhill, Massachusetts
Musicians from Haverhill, Massachusetts
American male film actors
American male television actors
20th-century American male actors
Male Western (genre) film actors
Western (genre) television actors
American stunt performers
American male guitarists
20th-century American guitarists
20th-century American male singers
20th-century American singers